The Big Dream is a 2009 Italian drama film directed by Michele Placido. It entered the main competition at the 66th Venice International Film Festival, in which Jasmine Trinca won the Marcello Mastroianni Award.

Plot 
In 1968, in Rome, at the famous La Sapienza University, a group of young people occupy the institution, starting a student revolt. The group of students is led by the proletarian Libero, son of unemployed workers of Fiat, who wants to permanently change the future for the youth of the country. The police oppose him, while the upper class student Laura falls in love with Libero. In the meantime, however, the Rome police plan to stifle the student revolt, and among these is the young Nicola, who secretly loves the theater, and wants to star in a famous company. When Laura meets Nicola, she changes perspective and the two fall in love. Nicola is tasked by the police to infiltrate the protesters and to discover the weak points so that the police can more easily attack the students.As soon as the attack begins one day, without warning, Laura discovers the true nature of Nicola, and breaks up with him. While Libero flees to Sicily, avoiding arrest, the young policeman decides to devote himself entirely to the theater.

Cast 
 Luca Argentero: Libero
 Riccardo Scamarcio: Nicola
 Jasmine Trinca: Laura
 Marco Iermanò: Andrea
Brenno Placido: Giulio
 Laura Morante:  Maddalena
 Massimo Popolizio: Domenico
 Dajana Roncione: Isabella
 Alessandra Acciai: Francesca
 Silvio Orlando: Police Captain
 Ottavia Piccolo: adult Laura

References

External links

2009 films
Italian drama films
Films directed by Michele Placido
2009 drama films
Films set in 1968
Films scored by Nicola Piovani
2000s Italian films